Myristica guatteriifolia is a species of plant in the family Myristicaceae. It is a tree found in Indonesia, Malaysia, Myanmar, the Philippines, and Vietnam.

References

guatteriifolia
Trees of Myanmar
Trees of Vietnam
Trees of Malesia
Least concern plants
Taxonomy articles created by Polbot